Sander Loones (born 26 January 1979 in Veurne) is a Belgian politician who was the Belgian Minister of Defence from 12 November 2018 to 8 December 2018.From 2014 to 2018, he was a Member of the European Parliament (MEP) for the New Flemish Alliance (N-VA) - the Belgian delegation to the European Conservatives and Reformists Group. He was Vice Chair of the European Parliament Committee on Economic and Monetary Affairs from 8 January 2015. On 12 November 2018, he succeeded Steven Vandeput as Minister of Defence.

References

1979 births
Living people
People from Veurne
New Flemish Alliance MEPs
MEPs for Belgium 2014–2019
Belgian Ministers of Defence